Stonehall is a townland in County Westmeath, Ireland. It contains the eastern part of the small lake, Lough Patrick, the remainder being in Killintown.

Stonehall is one of 11 townlands of the civil parish of Stonehall in the barony of Corkaree in the Province of Leinster. 

The neighbouring townlands are: Ballinriddera and Monintown to the north, Blackmiles and Knockbody to the east, Larkinstown to the south and Killintown to the west.

In the 1911 census of Ireland there were 9 houses and 47 inhabitants in the townland.

References

External links
Map of Stonehall at openstreetmap.org
Stonehall at the IreAtlas Townland Data Base
Stonehall at Townlands.ie
Stonehall at The Placenames Database of Ireland

Townlands of County Westmeath